Máté Bella (born 28 November 1985, in Budapest) is a Junior Prima Award, Erkel Ferenc and Béla Bartók–Ditta Pásztory Prize winner composer and university lecturer.

His work exhibits a wide range of genres and styles as evidenced by his classical and contemporary music, opera, choral works, musicals, theater music, and pop music. Prominent international orchestras perform his contemporary works, both his popular music and classical pieces are played on radio stations, while his music is presented in several theatres.

Life 
He commenced his musical studies at Erkel Ferenc Primary School for Music, and later studied at Weiner Leó Secondary Music School, specializing in composition and piano. He continued his music education at Bartók Béla Secondary Music School between 2002 and 2006, where the primary focus of his studies was composition as a student of Prof. Miklós Kocsár. After finishing high school in 2006, he was admitted to the Liszt Academy and graduated in 2011 as student of Prof. Gyula Fekete. In 2013 he studied at the Academy of Music in Kraków for a semester on an Erasmus scholarship in the class of Prof. Wojciech Widłak. In 2017, he was awarded a scholarship for the New National Excellence Program and a year later, in 2018 he received his summa cum laude doctoral degree. Since 2019, he has been a senior lecturer at the Liszt Academy.

In 2009, he was the youngest awardee of the first New Hungarian Music Forum composer competition organized by Müpa Budapest and the Budapest Music Center. This award has brought significant recognition for him, followed by several propositions to compose theatre music. This was followed by his ensemble piece Chuang Tzu's Dream which was acclaimed in the "under 30" category by several classical music radio stations  by the International Music Council in Lisbon in 2010. This piece was performed – amongst others – by the London Sinfonetta. In the same year, he was awarded the Junior Prima Award (given to those under the age of 30 for outstanding achievements in different fields) as the first composer to receive this recognition. In 2011 one of his pieces, written for a play of the Hungarian National Theatre, was given the Theatre Critics Award. Later, he received the Erkel Ferenc Award in 2016, and the Bartók-Pásztory Award in 2019.

Several Hungarian and international orchestras play his pieces, such as the Ensemble InterContemporain, the London Sinfonietta, the Ensemble Modern, the Klangforum Wien, the Munich Chamber Orchestra, the Bavarian Radio Symphony Orchestra, the Doelen Ensemble, the UMZE Chamber Ensemble, the Hungarian National Philharmonic or the Budapest Festival Orchestra. On 26 June 2017, Chuang Tzu's Dream was performed in the world-famous Tonhalle in Zurich, accompanied by works from composers such as Péter Eötvös, György Kurtág, Máté Balogh, Balázs Horváth and Péter Tornyai. The concert was conducted by Péter Eötvös. In 2018 his piece Lethe was played by the orchestra of the Lucerne Festival Academy in the Elbphilharmonie. His music has been staged in the Hungarian National Theatre, the Comedy Theatre of Budapest, the Budapest Operetta Theatre, the Budapest Puppet Theatre and the Hungarian State Opera. In 2017 his music composed for the movie Halj már meg! (Just Drop Dead) was nominated in the "Best Composer" category at the Hungarian Film Awards. The Song Mostantól (From Now On) with music by Máté Bella and Gergő Rácz, won the A Dal 2020 show and also received the Petőfi Music Award for Song of the Year and Hungarian Music Awards Fonogram prize in the best Hungarian modern pop-rock album or recording of the year category.

He composes several genres from popular to contemporary music, but primarily considers himself a contemporary composer. He does not aim to create an interchange between different genres. He considers it his mission to integrate Generation Y and Z into the classical music scene, making this genre both attractive and comprehensible for them. He is a member of the Artisjus Committee of Classical Music Critics, the Association of Hungarian Composers and the "Musician/Composer" section of the Hungarian Film Academy Association. He is one of the founder of the  contemporary composer group, created in 2016.

Main works

Chamber music

Ensemble

Orchestral works

Compositions for orchestra

Compositions for string orchestra

Vocal music

Choral works

Operas

Musicals

Theatre songs

Pop music

Theatre music

Film scores 
{| class="sortable" border=1 style="border-collapse: collapse; border-style: solid; border-width: medium; border-color: BlanchedAlmond;" width="450px"
|-  style="background:BlanchedAlmond;"
! width="55%" |Title
! width="35%" |Nationality, GenreDirector; Producer(s)
! width="10%" |Date
|-
| Indián
| Hungarian tragicomedyIstván P. Szabó; Placebo Stars, Sparks
| 2013
|-
| Just Drop Dead<sup>(Halj már meg!)</sup>
| Hungarian feature filmZoltán Kamondi; FocusFox Studio, Honeymood Films
| 2016
|}

 Discography 

 Awards 
 1st prize – Weiner Leó Composition Competition, Budapest, (2002)
 1st prize – 6th International Composition Competition (Farbotony), Kaniv, Ukrajna (2003)
 3rd prize – National Improvisation Competition, Budapest (2003)
 Special Prize – National Composition Competition, Budapest (2004)
 Special Prize – Vántus István Composer Competition, Association of Hungarian Composes and Vántus István Foundation, Szeged (2006)
 3rd prize – National Composition Competition, Budapest (2006)
 Shared 1st prize – Liszt Academy Composer Competition, Budapest (2007)
 ‘Best Songwriter’ Award – Academy of Drama and Film, Budapest (2007)
 Special Prize – Youth Contemporary Music Evenings, Budapest (2007)
 Special Prize – 9th Zdarzenia Theatre and Art Festival, Tczew (2007)
 Special Prize – Youth Contemporary Music Evenings, Budapest (2008)
 Special Prize – Wekerle centenarian, Wekerle Cultural Association, Budapest (2008)
 Special Prize – Youth Contemporary Music Evenings, Budapest (2009)
 1st prize – Liszt Academy Composer Competition, Budapest (2009)
 1st prize in Chamber Music – NHMF Composer Competition, Budapest (Chuang Tzu's Dream, 2009)
 Junior Prima Award (2010)
 Amongst the top three works in the ‘composers under 30’ category – International Rostrum of Composers, International Music Council, Lisbon (Chuang Tzu's Dream, 2010)
 3rd prize, Musical Competition of Madách Theatre, Budapest (Macskadémon/The Demon Cat, 2010)
 Shared 3rd prize – Liszt Academy Composer Competition, Budapest (2010)
 Istvánffy Benedek Prize (Chuang Tzu's Dream, 2010)
 Best theatre music – Theater Critics Award (Magyar ünnep, 2011)
 1st prize – Generace Composer Competition, Ostrava (2013)
 1st prize in Chamber Music – NHMF Composer Competition, Budapest (Trance, 2013)
 Istvánffy Benedek Prize (A tavasz ébredése, 2013)
 Amongst the top three works in the ‘composers under 30’ category – International Rostrum of Composers, International Music Council, Lisbon (Trance, 2014)
 1st prize – Generace Composer Competition, Ostrava (2015)
 Junior Classical Composer of the Year Artisjus Prize (2015)
 Ferenc Erkel Prize (2016)
 Béla Bartók–Ditta Pásztory Prize (2019)
 Petőfi Music Award for Song of the Year (Mostantól, 2020)
 Hungarian Music Awards Fonogram prize for Best Hungarian modern pop-rock album or recording of the year category (Mostantól'', 2020)

References 

 Official website
 
 Rostrum of Composers 2017 – Palermo (Hungarian Radio / Radio Hongroise) Máté Bella, rostrumplus.net – May 2015
 Bella, Máté, Editio Musica Budapest Ltd. emb.hu Retrieved 30 April 2019
 Mate Bella (Composer), betterthansexmusical.co.uk
 Bella, Máté, Budapest Music Center, info.bmc.hu

External links 

 Bella Máté YouTube channel
 
 Máté Bella, Gradus Artist Management
 
 
 “One must be able to give an account of each second and each note” – Interview with the composer Máté Bella, lfze.hu – 22. February 2018

1985 births
Hungarian composers
Living people